This is a list of the main career statistics of the professional German tennis player Julia Görges.

Performance timelines

Only main-draw results in WTA Tour, Grand Slam tournaments, Fed Cup and Olympic Games are included in win–loss records.

Singles

Doubles

Mixed doubles

Significant finals

Grand Slam finals

Mixed doubles: 1 (1 runner–up)

WTA Premier Mandatory & Premier 5 finals

Doubles: 1 (1 runner–up)

WTA Elite Trophy

Singles: 1 (1 title)

WTA career finals

Singles: 17 (7 titles, 10 runner-ups)

Doubles: 16 (5 titles, 11 runner-ups)

Team competition: 1 (1 runner-up)

ITF Circuit finals

Singles: 8 (6 titles, 2 runner-ups)

Doubles: 10 (6 titles, 4 runner-ups)

Head-to-head records

Record against top-10 players
Görges' record against players who have been ranked in the top 10.

Record against No. 11–20 players 
Görges' record against players who have been ranked world No. 11–20.

 Barbora Strýcová 6–6
 Shahar Pe'er 5–0
 Alizé Cornet 5–1
 Anastasija Sevastova 5–4
 Anastasia Pavlyuchenkova 4–3
 Eleni Daniilidou 3–0
 Petra Martić 3–0
 Kirsten Flipkens 3–1
 Donna Vekić 3–1
 Anabel Medina Garrigues 3–2
 Alison Riske-Amritraj 3–2
 Klára Koukalová 3–3
 Kaia Kanepi 3–4
 Yanina Wickmayer 3–6
 Sybille Bammer 2–0
 Anne Kremer 2–0
 Aravane Rezaï 2–0
 Katarina Srebotnik 2–0
 Mihaela Buzărnescu 2–1
 Sabine Lisicki 2–2
 Elena Vesnina 2–4
 Elise Mertens 1–0
 Alexandra Stevenson 1–0
 Wang Qiang 1–0
 Daria Gavrilova 1–1
 Anna-Lena Grönefeld 1–1
 Ana Konjuh 1–1
 Virginie Razzano 1–1
 Magdaléna Rybáriková 1–1
 Ágnes Szávay 1–1
 Markéta Vondroušová 1–1
 Zheng Jie 1–2
 Varvara Lepchenko 1–3
 Ekaterina Alexandrova 0–1
 Mirjana Lučić-Baroni 0–1
 Peng Shuai 0–1
 María José Martínez Sánchez 0–2
 Karolina Šprem 0–2

* Statistics correct .

Top 10 wins
Görges has a  record against players who were, at the time the match was played, ranked in the top 10.

Longest winning streak

15-match win streak (2017–18)

References

External links 
 
 
 

Görges, Julia